Manisankar Murasingh (born 1 January 1993) is an Indian cricketer who plays for Tripura. He was the leading wicket-taker for Tripura in the 2018–19 Ranji Trophy, with 32 dismissals in eight matches.

References

External links
 

1993 births
Living people
Indian cricketers
Tripura cricketers
Cricketers from Tripura
People from Agartala